Krishnanum Radhayum is a 2011 Indian Malayalam-language comedy-drama film written, directed, produced by and starring Santhosh Pandit. He also did the lyrics, music composing, fight choreography, art direction, editing, visual effects, singer, costumes, production designing and title graphics.

Pandit compared the film with Subramaniapuram, Engaeyum Eppothum, which created a new trend in Tamil Nadu, in a popular channel. He describes him as a trendsetter.

Plot
This film focuses on the love life of John (Santhosh Pandit) and Radha (Anusree) who admire each other despite belonging to different religions. They get married against the will of their families and consider leasing a house. Yeshodha and her daughter Rugmini are struggling for money and so they decide to rent a section of their house to tenants on the condition that they were Hindus. John and Radha come across this offer and to get the house, John changes his name to Krishnan. Throughout the film, John and Radha face many issues commonly concerning disagreements on their religions.

One day, Radha and John set off to assist Sreelatha, who refuses to eat her food after the death of her husband. John uses a few sneaky tactics and soon Sreelatha commences to follow a healthy diet. She calls John everyday to thank him and invites him to join her on her interview. Radha begins to get a bit suspicious and gets angry towards Sreelatha.

John has a kind natured heart and so he tends to help anyone who is in trouble. One day he saves his brother who was involved in a nasty fight. However, he gets hit in the head and collapses, ending up in hospital. Radha sets off to buy some medicine but does not return as she gets killed by the Uncle of Rugmini. When John finds out, he sets off to kill Rugmini's Uncle and his goons and gets into prison for murder. Life changes when he gets released.

Cast
 Santhosh Pandit as John (Krishna)
 Anusree as Radha
 Devika as Sreelatha

Soundtrack
All songs were composed by Pandit. Lyrics of seven songs were written by Pandit and A. S. Prasad wrote the lyrics of the song Guruvayoorappa.

Release
The film was released in 3 theatres on 21 October 2011 in Kerala. The film ran housefull on the first day of release. The film has been universally panned by the mainstream media.

The Deccan Chronicle reported that on one of the Saturdays in November 2011, Pandit was number two on Google trends and that the searches had "crested on October 21, the day when his debut movie Krishnanum Radhayum was released and it quickly got damned by film pundits".

References

External links
 

2011 comedy-drama films
2010s Malayalam-language films
2011 films
2011 directorial debut films
Indian comedy-drama films